Albert Widdowson (31 March 1864 – 28 April 1938) was an English cricketer who played for Derbyshire in 1894.

Widdowson was born in Bingham, Nottinghamshire and in 1881 was working on a farm. He played one match Derbyshire in  the 1894 season in July against Surrey in which he made one run.

Widdowson was identified as a scorer for Derbyshire in 1927.  He died in Duffield at the age of 74.

References

1864 births
1938 deaths
English cricketers
Derbyshire cricketers
People from Bingham, Nottinghamshire
Cricketers from Nottinghamshire
People from Duffield
Cricketers from Derbyshire